L'Esprit de famille is a Belgian novel by Jean Milo. It was first published in 1943. It won the Prix des Deux Magots in 1944.

References

1943 Belgian novels
French-language novels